Sindhu Nathi Poo is a 1994 Indian Tamil-language film directed by Senthamizhan in his debut. It stars Ranjith, newcomers Rajakumari, Ravi Shankar and Sanjeev Kumar. The film, produced by K. T. Kunjumon, was released on 14 January 1994.

Plot 

The film begins with a young man Sakthivel coming back to his village. At his return, he is respected and treated as God by the villagers, they call him Thirukkaval. Thirukkaval still hates his father Chettiar, stepmother Azhamu, stepbrother and stepsister. The kind-hearted Thirukkaval quickly makes enemies including Munnumunuthan, Kodumudi and his father Chettiar. Meanwhile, Pasupathy (Ravi Shankar) and Chinna Pulla (Rajakumari) fall in love with each other. The affair is soon exposed, so Thirukkaval arranges their wedding. Shortly after, Pasupathy dies in an accident and the villagers blame the innocent Thirukkaval.

In the past, Thirukkaval lived happily with his father Chettiar, his mother Shenbaga Valli and his baby sister Chittu. Chettiar had an affair with Shenbaga Valli's sister Azhamu, who became pregnant. Unable to bear the situation, Shenbaga Valli killed her baby daughter and committed suicide. The angry Thirukkaval injured his father's foot and run away. He then became a child labourer to make a living.

Meanwhile, Chinna Pulla's mother Appayi passes away. Thereafter, Thirukkaval is accused of having an affair with the widow Chinna Pulla. What transpires next forms the rest of the story.

Cast 

Ranjith as Thirukkaval (Sakthivel)
Rajakumari as Chinna Pulla
Ravi Shankar as Pasupathy
Sanjeev Kumar
Jaishankar as Chettiar
Manorama as Appayi
Kavitha as Azhamu
Kalpana as Shenbaga Valli (guest appearance)
Vadivelu as Nadesan
Vasu Vikram as Munnumunuthan
Kazan Khan as Kodumudi
Idichapuli Selvaraj as Kuberan
Dhamu as Soori
C. K. Saraswathi
Pandu
Loose Mohan
Swamikannu
Pasi Narayanan
Karuppu Subbiah
Rajathi
Yuvasri
Kavithasri
Pasi Sathya
Peeli Sivam
Amar
Baby Swathi as Chittu

Production 
Sindhu Nathi Poo is the directorial debut of Senthamizhan.

Soundtrack 
The soundtrack was composed by Soundaryan, with lyrics by Vairamuthu. The song "Aathadi Enna Odambu" attained popularity in 2018 due to a comical sequence performed by comedian KPY Ramar in a Tamil television show which became a hit on social media platforms. This re-emergence of popularity for the song led to it being remixed by Hiphop Tamizha for the film Natpe Thunai (2019).

Release and reception 
Sindhu Nathi Poo was released on 14 January 1994. Malini Mannath of The Indian Express gave the film a negative review, criticising the "jerky" narration, underdeveloped characters and the cast performances. Thulasi of Kalki criticised the story for lack of originality.

References

External links 
 

1990s Tamil-language films
1994 directorial debut films
1994 films